Reginald Ottrey Williams (1914–2012) was Archdeacon of Rangiora from 1968 until 1979.

He was educated at the University of New Zealand and ordained in 1941. After a curacy at Addington he was Priest in charge of Westland.  He then held incumbencies at Lincoln, Addington and Linwood before his appointment as archdeacon.

He died on 31 July 2012.

References

University of New Zealand alumni
2012 deaths
Archdeacons of Rangiora
1914 births